Nyein Way is a poet from Myanmar. His interests include experimental, avant-garde and contemporary Western and European poetry as well as Asian and African poetry, contemporary philosophy and Buddhism. He uses and conceptualizes differences between all of these interests to show the staggering and different realities of gaps in the 21st century.

Way introduced conceptual poetry and poetics in Myanmar, through his "Myanmar Conceptual Poets Station (MCPS)" Facebook page.

Publications
 Poems for the Hazara

External links
 http://www.poetryfoundation.org/harriet/tag/nyein-way
 http://www.aaa.org.hk/Collection/Details/25541
 http://ubu.com/contemp/way/Way-Nyein_TransNational.pdf
 http://irrawaddylitfest.com/nyein-way/
 http://lareviewofbooks.org/.../qa-james-byrne
 http://www.transart.org/transart-faculty-laura-gonzalez-contributes-crux-desper...
 http://www.gitameit.com/tag/nyein-way/

Living people
1962 births
21st-century Burmese poets
Burmese male poets
21st-century male writers